To Live and Die in Mongkok is a 2009 Hong Kong drama thriller film directed by Wong Jing and Billy Chung.

Synopsis
Fai (Nick Cheung), a legendary triad figure, was convicted and sent to prison for life, for slaughtering rival gangsters in a gang fight. A local council member assisted him with paroling, leading to his subsequent early release from prison 30 years later. However, Mongkok has completely changed and he has almost forgotten his way back home.

Fai's fellow gangster Porky (Willie Wai) is due to take over as head of their triad gang after years of service, but his personality is deemed unsuitable as a leader. Another member in the gang, Peter, also has interests set in becoming the leader. It becomes apparent that both Porky and Peter may be using Fai as a pawn in their game towards winning the grand prize.

It emerged that on that fateful night 30 years ago, Fai was shot by a policeman, Yue, who is now a major figure within the police force because he had managed to shoot Fai and therefore ensuring his arrest. Yue turns out to be someone with his own agenda as well, but things are not always as they seem and there is a different story to be told.

Meanwhile, Porky has unseemly interests in Pamela (Monica Mok), a prostitute who became a love interest of Fai, as well as her younger sister, who is mentally disabled. Porky constantly makes crude sexual advances towards the sisters, only to have Fai rescue them on numerous occasions, which causes further friction between them.

Cast
 Nick Cheung - Fai
 Paw Hee-Ching - Fai's mother
 Liu Kai-Chi - Cop
 Chan Lai-wun - Social worker
 Monica Mok - Pamela
 Natalie Meng - Penny
 Willie Wai - Porky
 Juno Leung
 Patrick Tam - Peter

External links

To Live and Die in Mongkok at the Hong Kong Movie Database
To Live and Die in Mongkok at the Hong Kong Cinemagic

2000s Cantonese-language films
2009 films
2000s crime films 
Hong Kong crime films 
Films directed by Wong Jing
2000s Hong Kong films